The Ministry of Citizenship and Multiculturalism is a ministry of the Government of Ontario that is responsible for citizenship and multiculturalism issues in the Canadian province of Ontario. From 2014 to 2016, it was known as the Ministry of Citizenship, Immigration and International Trade, then the ministry was reorganized and it reverted to its prior name. The Ministry of Citizenship and Immigration was dissolved in 2018, and its functions were taken over by the Ministry of Children, Community and Social Services. In 2021, the ministry was reintroduced as the Ministry of Citizenship and Multiculturalism. The current minister is Michael Ford.

2007 spending controversy

In 2007, the Ministry of Citizenship of Immigration was accused of using immigrant aid money as a slush fund by directing it to groups with strong Liberal ties. The Ontario Auditor General probed $32 million of spending over a 2-year period and found no direct evidence of money flowing due to political ties, but that political ties did exist and there were various governance deficiencies.

List of ministers

Citizenship and Culture
 Bruce McCaffrey, 1982–1983
 Susan Fish, 1983–1985
 Nick Leluk, 1985 (May–June)
 Lily Munro, 1985–1987

Citizenship
 Gerry Phillips, 1987–1989
 Bob Wong, 1989–1990
 Elaine Ziemba, 1990–1995

Citizenship, Culture and Recreation
 Marilyn Mushinski, 1995–1997
 Isabel Bassett, 1997–1999
 Helen Johns, 1999–2001

Citizenship
 Cam Jackson, 2001–2002
 Carl DeFaria, 2002–2003

Citizenship and Immigration
 Marie Bountrogianni, 2003–2005
 Michael Colle, 2005–2007
 Gerry Phillips, 2007 (July–October)
 Michael Chan, 2007–2010
 Eric Hoskins, 2010–2011
 Charles Sousa, 2011–2012
 Michael Chan, 2012–2013
 Michael Coteau, 2013–2014

Citizenship, Immigration and International Trade

 Michael Chan, 2014–2016

Citizenship and Immigration
 Laura Albanese, 2016–2018

Citizenship and Multiculturalism 

 Parm Gill, 2021-2022
 Michael Ford, 2022-present

See also
 Provincial Secretary and Registrar of Ontario
 Citizenship and Immigration Canada
 Fairness Commissioner (Ontario)
 Immigration to Canada

References

External links
 Ministry of Citizenship and Immigration
 Ontario Immigration – From the Ministry of Citizenship and Immigration

2003 establishments in Ontario
Ontario
Ministries established in 2003
Citizenship and Immigration
Immigration to Ontario

Migration-related organizations based in Canada